Kadir is the primary transliteration of two Arabic male given names (also spelled Ghader, Kader, Qader, Qadir or Quadir) and (also spelled Ghadir, Kadeer, Qadeer or Qadir). It's also one of the names of God in Islam, meaning "Almighty".

Kadeer
 Kadeer Ali (born 1983), English cricketer

Kader
 Kader Abdolah (born 1954), Iranian-Dutch writer, poet and columnist
 Kader Arif (born 1959), French politician
 Kader Asmal (1934–2011), South African politician
 Kader Hançar (corn 1999), Turkish women's footballer
 Kader Khan (born 1937), Indian film actor
 Abdel Kader Sylla (born 1990), Seychelles basketball player

Kadir
 Elishay Kadir (born 1987), Israeli basketball player
 Syed Abdul Kadir (born 1948), Singaporean boxer
 Kadir Arslan (born 1977), Turkish volleyball player
 Kadir Cin (born 1987), Turkish volleyball player
 Kadir İnanır (born 1949), Turkish film actor and director
 Kadir Keleş (born 1988), Turkish footballer
 Kadir Nelson, African American artist and illustrator
 Kadir Rana (born 1961), Indian politician
 Kadir Topbaş (1945–2021), Turkish architect

Qader
 Qader Eshpari (born 1967), Afghan singer

Qadir
 Al-Qadir (died 1031), Caliph of the later Abbasid caliphate ruled from 1st November 991 – 29th November 1031.
 Qadir Huseynov (born 1986), Azerbaijani chess Grandmaster
 Qadir Magsi (born 1962), Pakistani politician
 Qadir Obeidi (born 1947), Iraqi politician

Surname
 Aron Kader (born 1974), American comedian of Palestinian descent
 Asghar Qadir (born 1946), Pakistani mathematician
 Elishay Kadir (born 1987), Israeli basketball player
 Foued Kadir (born 1983), Algerian footballer
 Kamal Qadir (born 1958), Kurdish activist
 Khandan Kadir (born 1969), Afghan extrajudicial prisoner of the United States
 Rebiya Kadeer (born 1947), Uyghur businesswoman
 Zahir Qadir, Afghan politician
 Zunun Kadir (1911–1989), Uyghur writer
 Hasan Aljabar

See also
 Ghadir (disambiguation)
 Abdul Qadir
 Ghadir class submarine, Iranian submarine capable of launching torpedoes and rockets
 Qader (missile), Iranian anti-ship cruise missile
 Kadyrov (disambiguation)

Arabic-language surnames
Arabic masculine given names
Turkish masculine given names
Names of God in Islam
Surnames of Indonesian origin